New Zealand competed at the 1984 Summer Olympics in Los Angeles, United States. 130 competitors, 98 men and 32 women, took part in 76 events in 18 sports. The country recorded 11 medals, including eight golds, resulting in the nation ranking among the top ten in the medal table.

Medal tables

Archery

After a twelve-year hiatus from archery, New Zealand returned in 1984 with one man and two women. This included the first paraplegic Olympian, Neroli Fairhall.

Athletics

Track and road

Field

Boxing

Canoeing

Cycling

Seven cyclists represented New Zealand in 1984.

Road
Men's individual road race

Track
Men's 1 km time trial

Men's points race

Men's individual pursuit

Men's team pursuit

Men's sprint

Diving

Equestrian

Eventing

Jumping

Fencing

Two fencers, both men, represented New Zealand in 1984.

Field hockey

Men's tournament
Team roster

Pool B

5th–8th Classification round

7th / 8th Place play-off

New Zealand finished the men's field hockey tournament in seventh place.

Women's tournament
Team roster

Round robin

New Zealand finished the women's field hockey tournament in sixth place.

Gymnastics

Rhythmic

Women's individual all-around

Judo

Rowing

Men

Women

Sailing

Shooting

Men's 50 m rifle, prone

Men's 50 m running target

Mixed skeet

Swimming

Synchronised swimming

Weightlifting

Wrestling

Officials
Chef de Mission: Ron Scott

References

Nations at the 1984 Summer Olympics
1984
Summer Olympics